This is a list of American female country singers.

A

B

C

D

E

F

G

H

I-J

K

L

M

N

O-P

R

S

T

U-V

W-Z

 
American female country
American female country
Country singers
country singers
Lists of American musicians